Olga Aleksandrovna Matveevskaya (born 1882) was a Russian educator and politician. In 1917 she was one of the ten women elected to the Constituent Assembly, the country's first female parliamentarians.

Biography
Born in 1882, Matveevskaya grew up in a middle-class family and was educated at home. She later worked as a teacher in Pryluky. She joined the Socialist Revolutionary Party and was under police supervision since 1907, later being exiled to Arkhangelsk.

In 1917 she was a Socialist-Revolutionary candidate in Oryol in the Constituent Assembly elections, and was one of ten women elected to the legislature. She later died in a prison or prison camp.

References

1882 births
Russian educators
Russian revolutionaries
Russian Constituent Assembly members
20th-century Russian women politicians
Socialist Revolutionary Party politicians
Soviet people who died in prison custody
Date of death unknown
Female revolutionaries